This is a list of German football transfers in the winter transfer window 2021–22 by club. Only transfers of the Bundesliga, and 2. Bundesliga are included.

Bundesliga

Note: Flags indicate national team as has been defined under FIFA eligibility rules. Players may hold more than one non-FIFA nationality.

FC Bayern Munich

In:

Out:

RB Leipzig

In:

Out:

Borussia Dortmund

In:

Out:

VfL Wolfsburg

In:

Out:

Eintracht Frankfurt

In:

Out:

Bayer 04 Leverkusen

In:

Out:

1. FC Union Berlin

In:

Out:

Borussia Mönchengladbach

In:

Out:

VfB Stuttgart

In:

Out:

SC Freiburg

In:

Out:

1899 Hoffenheim

In:

Out:

Mainz 05

In:

Out:

FC Augsburg

In:

Out:

Hertha BSC

In:

Out:

Arminia Bielefeld

In:

Out:

1. FC Köln

In:

Out:

VfL Bochum

In:

Out:

SpVgg Greuther Fürth

In:

Out:

2. Bundesliga

Werder Bremen

In:

Out:

FC Schalke 04

In:

Out:

Holstein Kiel

In:

Out:

Hamburger SV

In:

Out:

Fortuna Düsseldorf

In:

Out:

Karlsruher SC

In:

Out:

SV Darmstadt 98

In:

Out:

1. FC Heidenheim

In:

Out:

SC Paderborn

In:

Out:

FC St. Pauli

In:

Out:

1. FC Nürnberg

In:

Out:

Erzgebirge Aue

In:

Out:

Hannover 96

In:

Out:

Jahn Regensburg

In:

Out:

SV Sandhausen

In:

Out:

Dynamo Dresden

In:

Out:

Hansa Rostock

In:

Out:

FC Ingolstadt 04

In:

Out:

See also

 2021–22 Bundesliga
 2021–22 2. Bundesliga

References

External links
 Official site of the DFB 
 Kicker.de 
 Official site of the Bundesliga 
 Official site of the Bundesliga

Football transfers winter 2021–22
Trans
2021-22